Cavan Halt railway station served Cavan in County Donegal, Ireland.

The station opened on 1 June 1931 on the Finn Valley Railway line from Strabane to Stranorlar.

It closed on 1 January 1960.

Routes

References

Disused railway stations in County Donegal
Railway stations opened in 1931
Railway stations closed in 1960